Anastasia Vyacheslavovna Ivleeva (born 8 March 1991), better known as Nastya Ivleeva, is a Russian TV presenter, actress and blogger. She also hosted the TV show Oryol i Reshka on the channel Friday!.

Biography 
Ivleeva was born on March 8, 1991, in the village of Razmetelevo, Leningrad Oblast. After finishing school, she entered the Faculty of Advertising and Public Relations at the St Petersburg State University. Back then, she used to work as a manicurist and hostess at entertainment venues. In 2015, Ivleeva moved to Moscow, where she got a job as a car dealership manager and entered Ostankino TV school of television.

In 2013, she started an Instagram blog. Ivleeva's first publications were devoted to sports until later on, she began shooting short humorous videos. As of April 2021, her main account on Instagram (_agentgirl_) counts over 18 million followers, while her second and more personal page (nastyaivleeva) has over 7.1 million followers. On TikTok, Ivleeva's audience amounts to 6.1 million followers. Also, Ivleeva has a YouTube channel with over 4.13 million subscribers. The content includes lifestyle and travel vlogs, AGENTSHOW talk-show premiered in 2018, and Z.B.S. SHOW (abbreviation in Russian for Stars. Grandmas. Bets). launched in the summer of 2020. All video production on the channel is supervised by Ivleeva personally.

In 2019, Ivleeva received a three-year ban from travelling to Ukraine due to her violation of Ukrainian legislation when she visited Crimea in 2017.

She was the sixth-highest Russian earner on Instagram in 2020.

Career

Television work 
In the fall of 2016, Nastya Ivleeva, together with blogger Eldar Dzharakhov and the host of This is Horosho web series Stas Davydov became the hosts of the reality show «Можно всё» (Everything is Possible), on the U channel.

In the spring of 2017, Ivleeva was invited to host the TV show, Oryol i Reshka. Perezagruzka (Heads and Tails. Reload) aired in Russia on the Friday! channel, which is owned by the Gazprom-Media holding, and on the Inter TV channel in Ukraine. Her co-host was Ukrainian DJ and showman Anton Ptushkin. According to Ivleeva, it was her popularity on Instagram that paved the way to television. At the end of 2018, the project has reached its culmination, and Nastya Ivleeva announced her retirement from the show.

At the end of September 2017, Ivleeva, together with Ida Galich, hosted the red carpet of the 5th MusicBox-2017 Real Award ceremony.

In 2018, she co-hosted the MUZ-TV Music Awards, taking the role that had long been performed by Lera Kudryavtseva. Ivleeva was also the host of New Radio's Major League award.

In 2019, Ivleeva returned to Oryol i Reshka for a special season called Ivleeva VS Bednyakov, where her co-host was Andrey Bednyakov, Ukrainian actor and TV presenter. In the summer of 2020, she made another come-back as the show's host after 690 thousand comments were left under the TV channel's publication asking to bring Ivleeva back to the project.

In February 2019, the Friday! channel premiered a new sitcom, Tourist Police, starring Nastya Ivleeva. Actors Mikhail Bashkatov, Sergei Pioro and Alexander Lyapin joined her in the cast.

In 2019, Ivleeva received two Russian television industry awards, TEFI. She was recognised in the categories ‘Best host of prime-time entertainment show’ and ‘Best prime-time entertainment talk show. The second award was given for the Agent Show programme (aired on the Friday! channel) which bypassed, among others, Secret for a Million (NTV) and Tonight (Channel One). Agent Show, the television version of the YouTube project, AGENTSHOW, had been broadcast on the Friday! channel since February 2019.

Collaborations with brands and media publications 
Ivleeva has starred in commercials for the telecom operator Beeline and the cosmetics manufacturer MAC. In 2016, she appeared on the cover of Maxim magazine. On August 21, 2018, Russian journalist Yuri Dud released an interview with Nastya Ivleeva on his YouTube channel, vDud.

In September 2018, Nastya Ivleeva covered Cosmopolitan magazine, and in June 2019 — Glamour magazine and in March 2021 - the Russian version of the Playboy magazine.

In the summer of 2019, Ivleeva endorsed the joint commercial campaign of the Russian retailer, Magnit, and American beverage manufacturer, Pepsi. As part of her ambassadorship, Nastya launched the Dance in Pepsi Style challenge on TikTok, which gained 100 million views. In the same year, another collaborative project between PepsiCo and Nastya Ivleeva was launched within the Magnit stores chain, which saw her create limited edition Lay's chips.

In 2020, Nastya Ivleeva appeared in the 33 Questions video, a project by Vogue Russia for their YouTube channel. In the same year, she starred in a commercial of the Russian telecom company, MTS.

During the lockdown implemented after the surge of the Covid-19 pandemic, Ivleeva launched a series of daily live streams on Instagram inviting famous guests as co-hosts. In May 2020, Instagram announced the list of accounts with the highest number of live stream viewers. Nastya Ivleeva appeared on that list, her best statistics having been recorded in April.
Also during the lockdown, Ivleeva launched a charity project to support small and medium-sized enterprises. The campaign was named Business will Live. Amidst the pandemic, she donated 1.5 million rubles to the charity foundations providing support to poor and severely ill people, as well as families with children in difficult living conditions. Part of the money was transferred to the Alliance of Doctors trade union, which provides protective gear to healthcare workers.

In March 2021, Ivleeva appeared on the cover of the Russian Playboy magazine. The production and shooting were carried out by her team.

In the spring of 2021, Ivleeva became an apostle for a charity app Help, which was founded by actor Nikita Kukushkin and conducts targeted support for the elderly. In June 2021, Nastya will host MUZ-TV 2021 Music Awards together with journalist Ksenia Sobchak and actor Alexander Revva.

Appearances in music videos 
In 2016, Ivleeva starred in the video for Arseny Borodin's song Rodnaya. In 2017, she appeared in HammAli & Navai's music video for Do you Want Me to Come? and Oleg Miami's If You are with Me. A year later, Ivleeva joined Ida Galich in her video Dima, as well as appeared in Elena Temnikova's Not Fashionable and Dima Bilan's Drunk Love. In May 2018, she covered Allj's single 360°.

Personal life 
After moving to Moscow, Ivleeva started dating Arseny Borodin, frontman of the Chelsea band. They had first met each other long before then, in 2011 in St. Petersburg. In October 2017, they broke up.

On June 13, 2018, Ivleeva revealed her new boyfriend, musician Alexey Konstantinovich Uzenyuk, better known as Eldzhey (Элджей). In September 2019, news appeared of their marriage.

List of releases

AgentShow

Z.B.S. SHOW

Filmography

Awards and nominations

Awards

Ratings

References

External links
 Официальный сайт Насти Ивлеевой
 На них нужно подписаться: сексуальная и смешная блогер Настя Ивлеева
 Ведущая Настя Ивлеева рассказала, как попала в «Орёл и решку» — Комсомольская правда
 Популярность в Instagram не поможет открыть все двери — Cosmopolitan
 Звезда Instagram Настя Ивлеева: Я стала популярной всего за полгода — Мир
  (RU.TV)
  (Авторадио)

Russian television presenters
Russian women television presenters
1991 births
Living people
Russian LGBT rights activists
Russian YouTubers
Russian bloggers
Russian women bloggers
Russian activists
Russian women activists
Russian activists against the 2022 Russian invasion of Ukraine
Russian TikTokers
Russian video bloggers